2010 Labour Party leadership election may refer to:

2010 Australian Labor Party leadership spill
2010 Labour Party leadership election (UK)

See also
2010 Social Democratic and Labour Party leadership election